Hancock County is a county located in the U.S. state of Maine. As of the 2020 census, the population was 55,478.  Its county seat is Ellsworth. The county was incorporated on June 25, 1789, and named for John Hancock, the first governor of the Commonwealth of Massachusetts.

Geography
The county high point is Cadillac Mountain, 1527 feet, the highest summit on the U.S. Atlantic seaboard.

Adjacent counties
Penobscot County — north
Washington County — northeast
Waldo County — west
Knox County — southwest

Demographics

2000 census
As of the census of 2000, there were 51,791 people, 21,864 households, and 14,233 families living in the county.  The population density was 33 people per square mile (13/km2).  There were 33,945 housing units at an average density of 21 per square mile (8/km2).  The racial makeup of the county was 97.61% White, 0.25% Black or African American, 0.37% Native American, 0.38% Asian, 0.03% Pacific Islander, 0.20% from other races, and 1.15% from two or more races.  0.65% of the population were Hispanic or Latino of any race.

The largest ancestry groups in Hancock County, Maine according to the 2000 census are:
 24.6% English
 16.6% American
 11.9% Irish
 6.6% French
 6.1% German

96.8% spoke English, 1.5% French and 1.0% Spanish as their first language.

There were 21,864 households, out of which 28.20% had children under the age of 18 living with them, 53.50% were married couples living together, 8.10% had a female householder with no husband present, and 34.90% were non-families. 27.90% of all households were made up of individuals, and 11.60% had someone living alone who was 65 years of age or older.  The average household size was 2.31 and the average family size was 2.81.

In the county, the population was spread out, with 22.30% under the age of 18, 7.40% from 18 to 24, 27.50% from 25 to 44, 26.80% from 45 to 64, and 16.00% who were 65 years of age or older.  The median age was 41 years. For every 100 females there were 95.70 males.  For every 100 females age 18 and over, there were 92.10 males.

The median income for a household in the county was $35,811, and the median income for a family was $43,216. Males had a median income of $30,461 versus $22,647 for females. The per capita income for the county was $19,809.  About 7.00% of families and 10.20% of the population were below the poverty line, including 11.90% of those under age 18 and 9.50% of those age 65 or over.

The 1990 Census counted 46,948, though the 1998 population estimate is 49,932.1 The gender division was 22,996 males, 23,952 females in 1989. Ninety-nine percent of the population was white (46,446), 121 American Indians, 249 Asians, 79 Blacks and 52 "other"

Sixty-six percent of the population of Hancock County are Mainers by birth, three percent were born outside the US.

Of the 31,475 persons over 25 years old, 83% (26,214) had a high school degree or higher. Twenty-one percent had a bachelor's degree or higher.

2010 census
As of the 2010 United States census, there were 54,418 people, 24,221 households, and 14,834 families living in the county. The racial makeup of the county was 96.9% white, 0.8% Asian, 0.4% American Indian, 0.4% black or African American, 0.3% from other races, and 1.2% from two or more races. Those of Hispanic or Latino origin made up 1.1% of the population. In terms of ancestry, 24.0% were English, 19.8% were American, 15.2% were Irish, 9.0% were German, and 7.2% were Scottish.

Of the 24,221 households, 24.4% had children under the age of 18 living with them, 48.9% were married couples living together, 8.2% had a female householder with no husband present, 38.8% were non-families, and 30.3% of all households were made up of individuals. The average household size was 2.20 and the average family size was 2.71. The median age was 46.3 years.

The median income for a household in the county was $47,533 and the median income for a family was $60,092. Males had a median income of $41,046 versus $32,444 for females. The per capita income for the county was $26,876. About 6.8% of families and 11.5% of the population were below the poverty line, including 17.2% of those under age 18 and 7.3% of those age 65 or over.

Economy
Of employed persons 16 years and over in 1990, 1,108 indicated involvement in the "agriculture, forestry and fisheries" industry, though 1,206 indicated "farming, forestry and fishing occupations."  The U.S. Census data are not dependable for determining the numbers of individuals involved in the fishing industry. Only firms with 10 or more employees must report their numbers, as well as firms paying workmen's compensation insurance. Because the majority of fishermen in Maine are considered self-employed, the statistics underreport fishing employment.

Cranberry Isles, Deer Isle, Frenchboro, Gouldsboro, Southwest Harbor, Stonington, Swans Island and Tremont (Bass Harbor) were identified by a key respondent as fisheries dependent. Bar Harbor, Brooklin, Brooksville, Hancock, Lamoine, Mount Desert, Penobscot, Sedgwick, Sorrento and Sullivan were also noted as having either significant fishing activity or a significant number of people who fish. Winter Harbor's fishing activities were once dwarfed by the economic activity associated with a naval base, but now that the naval base has closed, fishing activity will most likely be the dominant economic activity in the community. Salmon farming is also popular in the area and Maine Salmon is an important export.

Hancock County has the longest coastline of any Maine county. Commercial fishing and tourism are the county's most important industries. Hancock County is home to Acadia National Park  (the only national park in Maine or the New England region, excluding the national sea shore on Cape Cod) and Cadillac Mountain (the highest point in Maine's coastal region). Jackson Laboratory, noted for cancer research, is located in Bar Harbor. Two institutions of higher education are located in Hancock County: Maine Maritime Academy at Castine and the College of the Atlantic at Bar Harbor.

Air pollution 

The American Lung Association issues annual State of the Air reports.  Their current score card gives Hancock county an "F" for ozone pollution, the only Maine county to receive an F score.

Government and Politics

The county's Commissioners are William F. Clark, John Wombacher and Paul Paradis.

|}

Communities

City
Ellsworth (county seat)

Towns

Amherst
Aurora
Bar Harbor
Blue Hill
Brooklin
Brooksville
Bucksport
Castine
Cranberry Isles
Dedham
Deer Isle
Eastbrook
Franklin
Frenchboro
Gouldsboro
Great Pond
Hancock
Lamoine
Mariaville
Mount Desert
Orland
Osborn
Otis
Penobscot
Sedgwick
Sorrento
Southwest Harbor
Stonington
Sullivan
Surry
Swan's Island
Tremont
Trenton
Verona Island
Waltham
Winter Harbor

Unorganized territories
Central Hancock
East Hancock
Northwest Hancock

Census-designated places
Bar Harbor
Blue Hill
Bucksport
Castine
Southwest Harbor
Winter Harbor

Other unincorporated villages

Bass Harbor
Bernard
Corea
East Blue Hill
East Orland
Harborside
Hulls Cove
Islesford
Manset
Minturn
Northeast Harbor
Prospect Harbor
Salisbury Cove
Sargentville
Seal Cove
Seal Harbor
Somesville
Enoch's Landing
Sunset
Town Hill

Education
School districts include:

K-12:

 Airline Community School District
 Blue Hill School District
 Brooklin School District
 Brooksville School District
 Castine School District
 Cranberry Isles School District
 Dedham School District
 Deer Isle-Stonington Community School District
 Ellsworth Public Schools
 Hancock Public Schools
 Frenchboro School District
 Lamoine Public Schools
 Otis School District
 Penobscot School District
 Sedgwick School District
 Surry School District
 Trenton School District
 Regional School Unit 24
 Regional School Unit 25
 School Administrative District 76
 Hancock Unorganized Territory

Secondary:
 Mount Desert Community School District

Elementary:
 Bar Harbor School District
 Mount Desert School District
 Southwest Harbor School District
 Tremont School District

See also
 Aquaculture in Maine
 Nicatous Lake, the second largest lake in Hancock County
 National Register of Historic Places listings in Hancock County, Maine

References

External links
Official Website of Hancock County
Hancock County on Maine.gov

 
Maine counties
1789 establishments in Massachusetts
Populated places established in 1789